Jalizi may refer to:
 Jalizi-ye Bala, Ilam Province
 Jalizi-ye Pain, Ilam Province
 Jalizi-ye Abdolreza, Khuzestan Province
 Jalizi-ye Hanzaleh, Khuzestan Province